Allerheiligen im Mühlkreis is a municipality in the district of Perg in the Austrian state of Upper Austria. It is not to be confused with the Styrian municipality of Allerheiligen bei Wildon.

Population

References

Cities and towns in Perg District